Koos de Haas (10 September 1889 – 30 September 1966) was a Dutch rower. He competed in the men's double sculls event at the 1920 Summer Olympics.

References

External links
 

1889 births
1966 deaths
Dutch male rowers
Olympic rowers of the Netherlands
Rowers at the 1920 Summer Olympics
Rowers from Amsterdam